Roger Federer defeated Andre Agassi in the final, 6–3, 6–0, 6–4 to win the singles tennis title at the 2003 Tennis Masters Cup. It was the first of an eventual record six Tour Finals titles for Federer.

Lleyton Hewitt was the reigning champion, but did not qualify this year.

Seeds
A champion seed is indicated in bold text while text in italics indicates the round in which that seed was eliminated.

Alternate

Draw

Finals

Red group
Standings are determined by: 1. number of wins; 2. number of matches; 3. head-to-head records in two-player ties; 4. in three-player ties, percentage of sets won, or of games won; 5. steering-committee decision.

Blue group
Standings are determined by: 1. number of wins; 2. number of matches; 3. head-to-head records in two-player ties; 4. in three-player ties, percentage of sets won, or of games won; 5. steering-committee decision.

See also
ATP World Tour Finals appearances

External links
 2003 Tennis Masters Cup Draw

Singles
2003 ATP Tour